Mauro Bogliatto (born 24 February 1943) is a former Italian high jumper.

Biography
Bogliatto was born in Ala di Stura. He won two medals, at senior level, at the International athletics competitions. He finished 16th at the 1964 Olympic Games, he has 12 caps in national team from 1963 to 1966.

See also
 Men's high jump Italian record progression
 Italy at the 1963 Mediterranean Games

References

External links
 

1943 births
Italian male high jumpers
Living people
Athletes (track and field) at the 1964 Summer Olympics
Olympic athletes of Italy
Athletics competitors of Centro Sportivo Aeronautica Militare
Mediterranean Games gold medalists for Italy
Athletes (track and field) at the 1963 Mediterranean Games
Universiade medalists in athletics (track and field)
Mediterranean Games medalists in athletics
Universiade silver medalists for Italy
Medalists at the 1963 Summer Universiade